The Pyrenean, is a French breed of domestic donkey. It is distributed in a large area of south-western France, covering the whole of the regions of Aquitaine, Midi Pyrénées and Languedoc Roussillon. The largest concentration is in Aquitaine, which is a large part of the historic region of Gascony. The Pyrenean donkey breed unites two quite different types: the  short and powerful Gascon type, and the taller and more elegant Catalan type, which is the French population of the Catalan donkey breed, approximately 20% of the total number of which is in the Roussillon.

History 

The Pyrenean donkey was flourishing at the start of the twentieth century; the First World War reduced rural populations, and the donkey population also fell. The effects of the mechanisation of agriculture and transport led to a greater decline. The lowest point was reached in the 1990s, when no more than 20 animals remained. The breed was reconstituted with stock imported from Spain. The association maintains the stud book for the breed.

Characteristics 

Jacks of the Gascon type stand  at the withers, and jennies .

The coat may be glossy black, near-black, pangaré black, or chestnut bay. The lower part of the muzzle and the surround of the eyes are pale, as is the belly; there is no dorsal stripe, shoulder-stripe or zebra-striping of the legs. Most physical characteristics differ between the two types.

Use 

The Gascon type was used for agricultural work, both in harness and as a pack animal, carrying wood, hay, ice and the like. As in the past, Catalan jacks are used to sire mules; they may be bred with Castillonnais, Mérens or Navarrin mares of the region.
 
Pyrenean jennies may also  be used to produce asses' milk for cosmetic use.

References 

Donkey breeds
Donkey breeds originating in France
Fauna of the Pyrenees